The Deerfield Texaco Service Station, at 105 W. 6th in Deerfield, Kansas, is a historic one-story service station built in 1923 on the old U.S. Highway 50.  It was deemed significant for association with economic development and transportation in Deerfield, and for its Tudor Revival architecture.

It was listed on the National Register of Historic Places in 2007.

See also 
 Dave's Texaco, service station in Chinook, Montana

References 

Tudor Revival architecture in Kansas
Commercial buildings completed in 1923
Buildings and structures in Kearny County, Kansas
Gas stations on the National Register of Historic Places in Kansas
Texaco
National Register of Historic Places in Kearny County, Kansas